Rocky Comfort Creek may refer to:

Rocky Comfort Creek (Florida)
Rocky Comfort Creek (Georgia)